Nagadak (Nuğaźaq) is a rural locality (a village) in Nagadaksky Selsoviet, Aurgazinsky District, Bashkortostan, Russia. The population was 14 as of 2010. There is 1 street.

Geography 
Nagadak is located 29 km northeast of Tolbazy (the district's administrative centre) by road. Sofyino is the nearest rural locality.

References 

Rural localities in Aurgazinsky District